Twelve Points Historic District is a national historic district located at Terre Haute, Vigo County, Indiana. It encompasses 12 contributing buildings in a suburban commercial district of Terre Haute.  It developed between about 1905 and 1954, with most built between 1890 and 1920, and includes representative examples of Commercial, Art Deco, and Classical Revival style architecture.  Notable buildings include the Twelve Points State Bank (1919), People State Bank (1923), Twelve Points Hotel (1908), and Garfield Theater / Harmony Hall (1939).

It was listed on the National Register of Historic Places in 2005.

References

Historic districts on the National Register of Historic Places in Indiana
Commercial buildings on the National Register of Historic Places in Indiana
Art Deco architecture in Indiana
Neoclassical architecture in Indiana
Historic districts in Terre Haute, Indiana
National Register of Historic Places in Terre Haute, Indiana